David Farrar (born April 26, 1947) is a former American college basketball coach. He was a head coach at the  level for nine seasons, five at Middle Tennessee State and four at   As head coach of Hutchinson Junior College in Kansas, Farrar won a national championship

Career coaching record
NCAA Division I

References

External links
Sports-Reference.com - David Farrar

1947 births
Living people
American men's basketball coaches
Anderson University (Indiana) alumni
Ball State University alumni
Basketball coaches from Indiana
Basketball players from Indiana
College men's basketball head coaches in the United States
Junior college men's basketball coaches in the United States
Idaho Vandals men's basketball coaches
Louisiana Ragin' Cajuns men's basketball coaches
Middle Tennessee Blue Raiders men's basketball coaches
Mississippi State Bulldogs men's basketball coaches
South Alabama Jaguars men's basketball coaches
Western Kentucky Hilltoppers basketball coaches
Wyoming Cowboys basketball coaches
American men's basketball players